Stock Car is a 1955 British crime drama film directed by Wolf Rilla and starring Paul Carpenter, Rona Anderson, and Susan Shaw.

Plot
When her father dies during a stock car race, Katie Glebe (Rona Anderson) takes over the running of his garage, helped by American driver Larry Duke (Paul Carpenter). Katie struggles to fend off creditors, including the unscrupulous Turk McNeil (Paul Whitsun-Jones), who seeks to repossess her property. Further dramas ensue when Turk's girlfriend Gina (Susan Shaw) shows an interest in Larry.

Cast 
 Paul Carpenter as Larry Duke
 Rona Anderson as Katie Glebe
 Susan Shaw as Gina
 Harry Fowler as Monty Albright
 Robert Rietty as Roberto
 Paul Whitsun-Jones as Turk McNeil
 Sabrina as Trixie
 Alma Taylor as Nurse Sprott
 Patrick Jordan as Jack
 Lorrae Desmond as Singer
 Frank Thornton as Doctor

Critical reception
The Radio Times noted, "The mediocrity is unrelenting, with the race sequences every bit as hackneyed as the risible melodrama, although Susan Shaw briefly brightens things up as a shameless floozy"; while The Spinning Image noted, "the lower half of a double bill from British B-movie specialists Butchers, here in their element with a thriller that never did anything particularly spectacular, but provided enough thrills and spills to keep the audience in their seats for the duration, though being well aware that a more expensive and starry movie was following on must have helped in that department."

References

External links
 

1955 films
1955 crime drama films
British crime drama films
Films directed by Wolf Rilla
British black-and-white films
British auto racing films
1950s English-language films
1950s British films